"Ocean Front Property" is a song written by Dean Dillon, Hank Cochran and Royce Porter and recorded by American country music artist George Strait. It was released in December 1986 as the first single and title track from his album of the same name. It was a number-one hit in both the United States and Canada. On the 45 record single, "My Heart Won't Wander Very Far From You" is the B-side.

Content
The narrator tells his soon-to-be ex-lover that he will not miss her when she’s gone, ever take her back, or be haunted by her memory. He then reveals the sheer untruth of his claims and likens the impossibility of his moving on to that of obtaining ocean front property in the landlocked state of Arizona.

Critical reception

Ben Foster of Country Universe gave the song an A grade, saying that it is "subtly clever, yet deceptively simple, with a strong undercurrent of heartache." He goes on to say that Strait’s vocal interpretation is "just straightforward enough to keep the song’s left-of-center metaphor from coming across as campy, keeping the undertone of sadness fully intact."

Charts

Certifications

References

See also
Arizona Bay

1986 singles
George Strait songs
Songs written by Dean Dillon
Songs written by Hank Cochran
Song recordings produced by Jimmy Bowen
MCA Records singles
1986 songs
Songs written by Royce Porter